Ant Banks Presents T.W.D.Y.: Derty Werk is the debut studio album by American hip hop supergroup T.W.D.Y. (The Whole Damn Yay). It was released on April 20, 1999 via Thump Street Records. Production was handled entirely by member Ant Banks, who also served as executive producer. It features guest appearances from Otis & Shug, Gripsta, Playa Metro, Too $hort, Agerman, B-Legit, CJ Mac, Dolla Will, J-Dubb, Keak da Sneak, Mac Mall, Mac Shawn, MC Ant, Pooh-Man and Spice 1.

The album debuted at number 135 on the Billboard 200 and at number 41 on the Top R&B/Hip-Hop Albums in the United States. Its lead single, "Players Holiday", peaked at number 90 on the Billboard Hot 100 and become the group's most successful single, with music video starring all the three T.W.D.Y. members Ant Banks, Rappin' 4-Tay and Captain Save 'Em, as well as Mac Mall, Too $hort, Otis & Shug, E-40 and Ray Luv. The album's second single, "Drinks on Me", made it to number 18 on the Hot Rap Songs chart.

Banks settled his rivalry with MC Pooh-Man when they appeared together on the song "Ride Wit Me". The album is dedicated to Anthony "M.C. Ant" Thomas, who was killed in early 1999 and made his posthumous appearance on the song "Shook Niggas".

Track listing

Sample credits
Track 11 contains an interpolation of "Lovely Day" by Bill Withers

Notes
Tracks 11, 14 and 16 feature backing vocals from Otis Cooper
Tracks 11 and 16 feature backing vocals from Rafael "Shugg" Howell
Track 15 features backing vocals from Stacy Hogg

Chart history

Singles chart positions

References

External links

1999 albums
Ant Banks albums
Rappin' 4-Tay albums
Albums produced by Ant Banks